Epoch, in comics, may refer to:

Epoch (DC Comics), a DC Comics time-traveling character
Epoch (Marvel Comics), a Marvel Comics character, the offspring of Eon
 Epoch (Top Cow/Heroes and Villains), a comic series about a super-natural tournament featuring main character Jonah Wright

See also
Epoch (disambiguation)

References